Leuconium or Leukonion was a town of ancient Greece on the island of Chios.

Its site is unlocated.

References

Populated places in the ancient Aegean islands
Former populated places in Greece
Ancient Chios
Lost ancient cities and towns